Novell Storage Services (NSS) is a file system used by the Novell NetWare operating system. Support for NSS was introduced in 2004 to SUSE Linux via low-level network NCPFS protocol. It has some unique features that make it especially useful for setting up shared volumes on a file server in a local area network. 

NSS is a 64-bit journaling file system with a balanced tree algorithm for the directory structure. Its published specifications (as of NetWare 6.5) are:

 Maximum file size: 8 EB
 Maximum partition size: 8 EB
 Maximum device size (Physical or Logical): 8 EB
 Maximum pool size: 8 EB
 Maximum volume size: 8 EB
 Maximum files per volume: 8 trillion
 Maximum mounted volumes per server: unlimited if all are NSS
 Maximum open files per server: no practical limit
 Maximum directory tree depth: limited only by client
 Maximum volumes per partition: unlimited
 Maximum extended attributes: no limit on number of attributes.
 Maximum data streams: no limit on number of data streams.
 Unicode characters supported by default
 Support for different name spaces:  DOS, Microsoft Windows Long names (loaded by default), Unix, Apple Macintosh
 Support for restoring deleted files (salvage)
 Support for transparent compression
 Support for encrypted volumes
 Support for data shredding

See also 
 NetWare File System (NWFS)
 Comparison of file systems
 List of file systems

External links 
 Article about NSS
 Novell Storage Services - Features
 

Compression file systems
Disk file systems
Novell NetWare